The FR 7 and FR 8 are bolt-action rifles adopted by Spain in the 1950s. The "FR" stands for Fusil Reformado in Spanish ("Converted Rifle" in English).
The FR 7 is a variant of the "Spanish M93 Mauser" bolt action while the FR 8 is based on the "Mauser System 98" bolt action. Due to their light weight, short barrel and the calibre used,
their recoil and muzzle blast are relatively heavy.

History 
The FR7 and FR8 were introduced in the 1950s when the Spanish military was already implementing the CETME automatic rifle, but did not yet have sufficient inventory to equip and train all troops. The rifles were made from existing stockpiles of Mauser bolt-action rifles. The FR-7 was a modification of the Model 1916 short rifle, which in turn was based on the Mauser Model 1893. These three rifles are often referred to as being "small ring" Mausers, as the receiver ring is smaller in diameter than the latter Model 1898 by .110-inch (1.410 inches vs. 1.300 inches).
The FR-8 was developed from the Model 1943 short rifle, which was based on "large ring" Model 1898 Mauser action. Both rifles were modified to fire 7.62×51mm NATO. The FR 8 was used well into the 1970s by mounted Guardia Civil units in the Sierra Nevada.

Features 
The flash hider was designed to also function as a rifle grenade launcher, compatible with NATO-standard 22 mm rifle grenades. It also has notches in it so that wire could be cut with it by firing a round. The under-barrel tube, which resembles the gas cylinder found on automatic weapons, actually serves as the bayonet mount and as storage for cleaning gear. The front sight is elevation-adjustable via a special tool. Operation is identical to the standard Mauser design.

Images

See also
 Karabiner 98k
 Mosquefal

References

Sources
"Guns Magazine", May 2006, Holt Bodinson; text transcript under www.findarticles.com

External links
 Modern Firearms - FR-7, FR-8
 
 Spanish FR-8: the "Cetmeton" at Forgotten Weapons

Mauser rifles
Rifles of Spain
Bolt-action rifles
7.62×51mm NATO rifles